Thakur may refer to:

 Thakur (title), a feudal title and surname used by erstwhile nobility of India
 Rajput, an Indian caste also known by the name "Thakur"
 Thakur village, a residential locality in Mumbai, India

See also 
 
 Thaker, an Indian family name
 Thakkar, an Indian family name
 Thakar (tribe), an Adivasi tribe of Maharashtra, India
 Thakor, a Hindu Koli caste in Gujarat
 Thakura (disambiguation)